is a Japanese director best known for his work on the  Pokémon anime franchise. He also directed Magical Princess Minky Momo, Leda: The Fantastic Adventure of Yohko, The Three Musketeers Anime,  Ushio and Tora, Kimagure Orange Road: Summer's Beginning, Plawres Sanshiro, Slayers Return, Slayers Great, and Wedding Peach.

Career

Developing an interest in animation while still at high school, Yuyama worked as an animator's assistant on episodes of Star Blazers and Brave Raideen. He was a sketch artist and storyboard artist on the foreign co-production Barbapapa (1973) and joined Aoi Productions in 1978. The same year, he had his directorial debut while working for Aoi on Galaxy Express 999, and soon struck up a successful working partnership with the screenwriter Takeshi Shudo on GoShogun. In 1982, he promoted to "chief director", an overseeing role on Magical Princess Minky Momo. While remaining in TV during the 1980s, he also played a leading role in anime's exodus into video. His work also showed a mastery of elements for a female audience, most obvious in his Three Musketeers spin-off, Aramis' Adventure. After working on Ushio and Tora, he gained true fame through his involvement with later works on Pokémon.

Filmography

Anime

Live-action

References

External links

1952 births
Living people
Anime directors
Japanese animators
Tatsunoko Production people